Workers' Party of Ecuador (in Spanish: Partido de los Trabajadores del Ecuador) is a communist party in Ecuador. PTE was formed in 1996 as a split from the Marxist-Leninist Communist Party of Ecuador. PTE publishes Amanecer Insurgente.

References

External links
Party website

1996 establishments in Ecuador
Communist parties in Ecuador
Political parties established in 1996